Preston James Robertson (September 16, 1891 in Rockville, Maryland – October 2, 1944 in New Orleans, Louisiana) was a pitcher in Major League Baseball. He pitched in two games for the Cincinnati Reds in 1913, thirteen games for the 1918 Brooklyn Robins and seven games for the 1919 Washington Senators.

External links

1891 births
1944 deaths
Brooklyn Robins players
Washington Senators (1901–1960) players
Cincinnati Reds players
Baseball players from Maryland
Major League Baseball pitchers
Savannah Indians players
Birmingham Barons players
New Orleans Pelicans (baseball) players
Fort Worth Panthers players
Houston Buffaloes players
Shreveport Sports players